This is a list of circus skills, dances, performance arts, sports, and other activities that involve acrobatics.

 Acrobalance – Acrobatic art that combines elements of adagio and hand balancing.
 Acroyoga – Physical practice which combines yoga and acrobatics.
 Adagio – Performance of partner acrobalance poses and associated movements that involve stationary balances by a pair of performers.
 Aerial hoop – Circular steel apparatus (resembling a hula hoop) suspended from the ceiling, on which circus artists may perform aerial acrobatics.
 Aerial silk – Performance in which one or more artists perform aerial acrobatics while hanging from a fabric.
 Aerobatics – Practice of flying maneuvers involving aircraft attitudes that are not used in normal flight.
 Artistic cycling – Competitive indoor cycling in which athletes perform tricks (called exercises) for points on specialized, fixed-gear bikes in a format similar to ballet or gymnastics.
 Bossaball – Ball game between two teams, combining elements of volleyball, football and gymnastics with music into a sport.
 Capoeira – Afro-Brazilian martial art that combines elements of dance, acrobatics and music.
 Cheerleading -  is an activity in which the participants (called cheerleaders) cheer for their team as a form of encouragement.
 Contortion – Performance art in which performers called contortionists showcase their skills of extreme physical flexibility.
 Corde lisse – Aerial circus skill or act that involves acrobatics on a vertically hanging rope.
 Cyr wheel – Acrobatic apparatus that consists of a single large ring made of aluminum or steel with a diameter approximately  taller than the performer.
 Dances:
 Acro dance – Combines classical dance technique with precision acrobatic elements.
 Ballet – Performance dance that originated during the Italian Renaissance in the fifteenth century and later developed into a concert dance form in France and Russia.
 Breakdancing or b-boying – Athletic style of street dance from the United States.
 Hopak – Ukrainian folk dance originating as a male dance among the Zaporozhian Cossacks but, later danced by couples, male soloists, and mixed groups of dancers.
 Lindy Hop – American dance which was born in the African-American communities in Harlem, New York City, in 1928 and has evolved since then.
 Pole dance –  Combines dance and acrobatics centered on a vertical pole.
 Rock and roll – Very athletic, competitive form of partner dance that originated from Lindy Hop.
 Swing dance – Group of dances that developed with the swing style of jazz music in the 1920s–1940s, with the origins of each dance predating the popular "swing era".
 Diving – Sport of jumping or falling into water from a platform or springboard, usually while performing acrobatics.
 Globe of death – Circus and carnival stunt where stunt riders ride motorcycles inside a mesh sphere ball.
 Figure skating – Sport in which individuals, pairs, or groups perform on figure skates on ice.
 Freerunning – Way of expression by interacting with various obstacles and environment. May include flipping and spinning.
 Freestyle BMX – Bicycle motocross stunt riding on BMX bikes.
 Freestyle motocross – Variation on the sport of motocross in which motorcycle riders attempt to impress judges with jumps and stunts.
 Freestyle scootering – Extreme sport that involves using stunt scooters to perform freestyle tricks that are similar to bicycle motocross (BMX) and skateboarding.
 Freestyle skiing – Skiing discipline comprising aerials, moguls, cross, half-pipe, slopestyle and big air as part of the Winter Olympics.
 Freestyle skydiving – Competitive skydiving discipline where one member of a two-person team performs acrobatic manoeuvres in free fall while the other one films the performance from a close distance using a helmet-mounted camera.
 Gymnastics – Sport that includes physical exercises requiring balance, strength, flexibility, agility, coordination, and endurance.
 Hooping – Manipulation of and artistic movement or dancing with a hoop (or hoops).
 Juggling – Physical skill, performed by a juggler, involving the manipulation of objects for recreation, entertainment, art or sport.
 Jump rope – Tool used in the sport of skipping/jump rope where one or more participants jump over a rope swung so that it passes under their feet and over their heads.
 Kiteboarding – Extreme sport where the kiteboarder harnesses the power of the wind with a large controllable power kite to be propelled across the water, land, or snow.
 Parkour – Training discipline using movement that developed from military obstacle course training. Includes running, climbing, swinging, vaulting, jumping, plyometrics, rolling, quadrupedal movement (crawling).
 Pole climbing – Ascending a pole which one can grip with his or her hands.
 Professional wrestling – Form of wrestling and athletic theatrical performance, wherein athletic performers portray prizefighters competing in matches with predetermined, scripted outcomes.
 Russian bar – Circus act which combines the gymnastic skills of the balance beam, the rebound tempo skills of trampoline, and the swing handstand skills of the uneven bars and the parallel bars.
 Salto del pastor (shepherd's leap) – Folk sport practised throughout the Canary Islands.
 Skateboarding – Action sport that involves riding and performing tricks using a skateboard, as well as a recreational activity, an art form, an entertainment industry job, and a method of transportation.
 Slacklining – Act of walking, running or balancing along a suspended length of flat webbing that is tensioned between two anchors.
 Snowboarding – Recreational and competitive activity that involves descending a snow-covered slope while standing on a snowboard that is almost always attached to a rider's feet.
 Spanish web – Aerial circus skill in which a performer climbs and performs various tricks on an apparatus resembling a vertically hanging rope.
 Surfing – Surface water sport in which an individual, a surfer, uses a board to ride on the forward section, or face, of a moving wave of water, which usually carries the surfer towards the shore.
 Synchronized swimming – Hybrid form of swimming, dance, and gymnastics, consisting of swimmers performing a synchronised routine of elaborate moves in the water, accompanied by music.
 Teeterboard – Acrobatic apparatus that resembles a playground seesaw. The well-trained flyer performs various aerial somersaults, landing on padded mats, a human pyramid, a specialized landing chair, stilts, or even a Russian bar.
 Tightrope – Skill of walking along a thin wire or rope. It has a long tradition in various countries and is commonly associated with the circus.
 Trampolining – Recreational activity, acrobatic training tool as well as a competitive Olympic sport in which athletes perform acrobatics while bouncing on a trampoline.
 Wall running – Sport where the participant uses a wall and platforms placed next to the trampoline bed to do tricks.
 Trapeze – Short horizontal bar hung by ropes or metal straps from a support. It is an aerial apparatus commonly found in circus performances.
 Tricking – Training discipline that combines kicks with flips and twists from martial arts and gymnastics as well as many dance moves and styles from breakdancing.
 Water skiing – Surface water sport in which an individual is pulled behind a boat or a cable ski installation over a body of water, skimming the surface on two skis or one ski.
 Wheel of death – Large rotating apparatus on which performers carry out synchronized acrobatic skills.
 Wushu – Hard and soft and complete martial art, as well as a full-contact sport.

List of acrobatic activities
Acrobatic activities